Tamarisk is a common name for plants in the genus Tamarix, also referred to as saltcedar

Tamarisk may also refer to:

 Tamarisk (colour), named after the colour of Tamarix flowers
 Tamarisk, East Lansing, Michigan, a neighborhood in East Lansing, Michigan
 Tamarisk (Isles of Scilly), a British royal residence
 Tamarisk (horse), a racehorse that was named European Champion Sprinter in 1998
 Operation Tamarisk, a Cold War espionage operation

See also
 Tamarisk jird, a rodent native to Central Asia